Young Man with Ideas is a 1952 romantic comedy film directed by Mitchell Leisen and starring Ruth Roman and Glenn Ford. It was released by Metro-Goldwyn-Mayer. The screenplay concern a young small-town lawyer, who moves his family from Montana to Los Angeles in the hope of passing the bar in California to ensure that his family can have a more prosperous lifestyle.

Plot
Maxwell Webster is a Montana attorney whose career isn't going as well as wife Julie feels it should be. She gets tipsy at a country club dinner and praises her husband's work in front of colleagues, then urges him to ask boss Edmund Jethrow for a partnership. Instead, he loses his job.

They move to Los Angeles for a fresh start. All they can afford is a modest house where a bookie operation seems to be sharing their telephone line. The kind-hearted Max has only $12 to his name but lends it to a nightclub singer, Dorianne Grey. He shares books with young Joyce Laramie as both study for their California bar exam, which Joyce already has failed twice.

Misunderstandings develop. A gambler named Eddie wrongly believes Max is the bookie who owes him $800. Joyce helps get Max a job with a collection agency, but it turns out to use questionable business tactics. Julie writes home to Montana, trying to get Max's old job back. He is upset by her lack of confidence in him.

Eddie turns up and threatens Max, who slugs him. This leads to mob boss Brick Davis' getting involved and a brawl in Eddie's club, where Dorianne performs. Max is arrested and defends himself in court, over Julie's objections. He wins the case and then Joyce reveals they've both passed the bar. Julie, upset with her own behavior, is delighted to learn that a successful lawyer witnessed Max's work in court and has offered him a job.

Cast

Main
 Glenn Ford as Max Webster
 Ruth Roman as Julie Webster
 Nina Foch as Joyce Laramie
 Denise Darcel as Dorianne
 Ray Collins as Jethrow
 Sheldon Leonard as Rodwell 'Brick' Davis

Supporting
 Donna Corcoran as Caroline Webster
 Mary Wickes as Mrs. Jarvis Gilpin
 Bobby Diamond as Willis Gilpin
 Dick Wessel as Eddie Tasling
 Carl Milletaire as Tux Cullery
 Curtis Cooksey as Judge Jennings
 Karl 'Killer' Davis as Punchy (Credited as Karl Davis)
 Fay Roope as Kyle Thornhill
 John Call as Man With Bushy Hair
 Nadine Ashdown as Susan Webster
 Barry Rado as Max, Junior
 Norman Rado as Max, Junior
 Wilton Graff as Mr. Cardy
 Martha Wentworth as Mrs. Hammerty

Music
Denise Darcel sings I Don't Know Why (I Just Do) and Amoure Cherie.

Reception
According to MGM records the film earned $565,000 in the US and Canada and $283,000 elsewhere, resulting in a loss of $754,000.

According to Bosley Crowther,

"this cheerful and unpretentious flurry of straight domestic farce has a lot more to recommend it than you'll find in some of [MGM's] heavier, gaudier films"; the script is "elastic and pleasingly written", its direction is "of a measuredly careless, off-beat sort that clips you with sudden droll surprises", and it is "played with seeming relish by a comparatively second-flight cast that appears to be thoroughly delighted to have something bouncy to do."

According to Turner Classic Movies,

Though Young Man with Ideas is one of Leisen's lesser efforts and represents the beginning of the end of his long career, the film features a good comedic performance by Glenn Ford, some excellent supporting work from Nina Foch, a brisk pace that reveals a light directorial touch, and a reasonable perspective on the trials and tribulations of romance.

References

External links
 
 
 
 

1952 films
American black-and-white films
1950s romantic comedy-drama films
American courtroom films
1950s English-language films
Films directed by Mitchell Leisen
Films scored by David Rose
Films set in Los Angeles
1952 comedy-drama films
American romantic comedy-drama films
1952 romantic comedy films
1952 romantic drama films
1950s American films